Neil Robert Smith (18 June 1954 – 29 September 2012) was a Scottish geographer and academic. He was Distinguished Professor of Anthropology and Geography at the Graduate Center of the City University of New York, and winner of numerous awards, including the Globe Book Award of the Association of American Geographers.

Background
Smith was born in 1954 in Leith, Scotland. He was one of four children of a schoolteacher, and spent most of his childhood in Dalkeith, southeast of Edinburgh. He attended King's Park Primary School and Dalkeith High School.

Smith earned his 1st class BSc from the University of St. Andrews in 1977 (with a year at the University of Pennsylvania, 1974–1975), and his PhD from Johns Hopkins University in 1982, where his advisor was noted Marxist geographer David Harvey. He took up a tenure-track position at Columbia University in New York (1982–1986), but Columbia closed its Geography Department and he moved to Rutgers University in New Jersey (1986–2000). At Rutgers he was Chair of the Geography Department (1991–94) and a senior fellow at the Center for the Critical Analysis of Contemporary Culture.

Smith lived in New York, latterly splitting his time between New York and Toronto, Canada, where he owned a house with his partner, Deb Cowen. From 2008 to 2012 he held a 20 percent appointment as Sixth Century Professor of Geography and Social Theory at the University of Aberdeen in his native Scotland.

Known for cultivating a new generation of critical geographers, Smith was devoted to teaching and research. However, for many of his female students it was not devotion but sexual harassment, as "more than one woman student left departments Neil taught in because of his unwelcome and persistent advances."

Scholarship
Smith's research explored the broad intersections between space, nature, social theory, and history. His dissertation at Johns Hopkins University was supposed to have been on urban processes, but was in fact a major theoretical treatise that became the book Uneven Development: Nature, Capital and the Production of Space (1984). In this major work of social theory, Smith proposed that uneven spatial development is a function of the procedural logic of capital markets; thus society and economies "produce" space.

Smith is credited with theories about the gentrification of the inner city as an economic process propelled by urban land prices and city land speculation, rather than by cultural preferences for living in the city in his seminal article "Toward a Theory of Gentrification: A Back to the City Movement by Capital, not People" (1979).

Smith's curiosity about why such critical study of space and place came so late to the discipline of geography lead to his study of early 20th-century geographer Isaiah Bowman and the book American Empire: Roosevelt's Geographer and the Prelude to Globalization (2003), which traced America's rise to global power through geographical ignorance. The book won several awards, including the Henry Adams Prize of the Society for History in the Federal Government. Smith's critique of American-led, capitalist neoliberalism was further developed in The Endgame of Globalization (2005).

Recognition
 Los Angeles Times Book Award, Biography, 2004
 Henry Adams Book Prize, Society of Historians in Federal Government, 2004
 Globe Award for Public Understanding of Geography, Association of American Geographers, 2004
 Distinguished Scholarship Honors, Association of American Geographers, 2000
 John Simon Guggenheim Fellowship, 1995–1996
 Board of Trustees Research Fellowship Award, Rutgers University, 1988–89
 The Scottish Geographical Medal, awarded by the Royal Scottish Geographical Society, 1977
 Robert Lincoln McNeil Scholar, University of Pennsylvania, 1974–75

Death
Smith died on 29 September 2012, from liver and kidney failure. He had been diagnosed with liver disease some years prior to his death, but he returned to drinking alcohol in 2011. He was survived by his three siblings; his partner, geographer Deborah Cowen, his former wife, geographer Cindi Katz, and his daughter Isabella DeRiso.

Cultural references

The Edinburgh-based band New Urban Frontier took their name from the title of Smith's book The New Urban Frontier: Gentrification and the Revanchist City. Their 2015 album Game of Capital also commemorates him.

Publications 
Books
 2009. Democracy, States, and the Struggle for Global Justice. Routledge (edited with Heather Gautney, Omar Dahbour and Ashley Dawson).
 2006 The Politics of Public Space (with Setha Low). Routledge.
2006 La Produccion de la Naturaleza; La Produccion del Espacio. Mexico City: Sistema Universidad Abierta, Universidad Nacional Autonoma de Mexico, 2006
 2005 The Endgame of Globalization. Routledge.
 2005 Capital Financiero, Propiedad Inmobiliaria y Cultura. MACBA & Publicacions de la Universitat Autonoma de Barcelona, Barcelona (with David Harvey)
 2003 American Empire: Roosevelt's Geographer and the Prelude to Globalization. University of California Press (winner, Los Angeles Times Book Prize for Biography).
 2000 Globalización: Transformaciones urbanas, precarización social y discriminación de género (with Cindi Katz). Nueva Grafica, S.A.L. La Cuesta, La Laguna.
 1996 The New Urban Frontier: Gentrification and the Revanchist City. Routledge.
 1994 Geography and Empire: Critical Studies in the History of Geography (edited with Anne Godlewska). Basil Blackwell, Oxford.
 1986 Gentrification of the City (edited with Peter Williams). George Allen and Unwin, London.
 1984 . Basil Blackwell. 2nd ed. 1990, 3rd Ed. University of Georgia Press, Athens, GA, 2008; London: Verso, 2010. (Translated and published as Desenvolvimento Desigual, Editora Bertrand Brasil, Rio de Janeiro, 1988)
 1977. Geography, Social Welfare and Underdevelopment. University of St. Andrews (edited with Malcolm Forbes and Michael Kershaw).

Articles
 2011 “Ten Years After,” Geographical Journal 177, 
 2011 “Uneven Development Redux,” New Political Economy 16: 261–265.
 2010 “’Martial Law in the Streets of Toronto’: G20, Security and State Violence,”  Human Geography 3.3:29–46,
 2010 “The Revolutionary Imperative,” Antipode 41: 50–65.
 2009 “After Geopolitics? From the Geopolitical Social to Geoeconomics,” Antipode 40: 2–48 (with Deborah Cowen)
 2008 “The Shock Doctrine: a discussion,” Society and Space 26:582–595 (with Naomi Klein)
 2008 "Review Essay: David Harvey: A Critical Reader,” Progress in Human Geography, 32,1:147–155.
 2007 “Gentrification, Displacement, and Tourism in Santa Cruz de Tenerife,” Urban Geography, 28, 2007, 276–298 (with Luz Marina García Herrera and Miguel Angel Mejías Vera)
 2007 “Another Revolution is Possible: Foucault, ethics and politics,” Environment and Planning D: Society and Space, 25:191–193
 2006 “Nature as Accumulation Strategy”, Socialist Register, 16–36
 2006 “The Endgame of Globalization”, Political Geography, 25,1:1–14.
 2003 “Global Executioner”, The South Atlantic Quarterly, 105,1: 55–69.
 2003 “Neo-Critical Geography, Or, The Flat Pluralist World of Business Class”, Antipode, 37, 5: 887–899.
 2003 “After Iraq: Vulnerable imperial stasis”, Radical Philosophy, 127, September/October: 2–7.
 2003 “After the American Lebensraum: ‘Empire’, Empire, and Globalization”, Interventions, 5:2:249-270.
 2003 "Geographies of Substance" in Envisioning Human Geography, Paul Cloke, Philip Crang, and Mark Goodwin, eds.
 2003  "Gentrification Generalized: From Local Anomaly to Urban 'Regeneration' as Global Urban Strategy" in Frontiers of Capital: Ethnographic Reflections on the New Economy, M. Fisher and G. Downey, eds.
 2003 "Generalizing Gentrification" in Retours en ville, Catherine Bidou, Daniel Hiernaux, and Helene Riviere D'Arc, eds. Paris: Descartes & Cie. January.
 2002 "Scale Bending" in Rethinking Scale, E. Sheppard and R. McMaster, eds.
 2002 "Remaking Scale: Competition and Cooperation in Prenational and Postnational Europe" in State/Spaces.
 2002 "Scales of Terror: The Manufacturing of Nationalism and the War for U.S. Globalism", pp. 97–108 in After the World Trade Center, Sharon Zukin and Michael Sorkin, eds. New York: Routledge.
 2002 "New Globalism, New Urbanism: Gentrification as Global Urban Strategy", Antipode 34 (3): 434–57. Reprinted in "Neo-Liberal Urbanism", Neil Brenner and Nik Theodore, eds., Malden, MA: Basil Blackwell.
 2002 "Ashes and Aftermath", Studies in Political Economy 67. Spring, pp. 7–12.
 2002 "Ashes and Aftermath", Philosophy & Geography 5 (1): 9–12.
 2002 "Kontinuum New York", pp. 72–86 in Die Stadt Als Event, Regina Bittner, ed. Dessau, Bauhaus.
 1979 "Toward a Theory of Gentrification A Back to the City Movement by Capital, not People". Journal of the American Planning Association 45 (4): 538–48.

References

External links
Center for Place Culture and Politics

In conversation with Erik Swyngedouw, 2012

2012 deaths
1954 births
Alumni of the University of St Andrews
Graduate Center, CUNY faculty
Johns Hopkins University alumni
Rutgers University faculty
Columbia University faculty
Scottish anthropologists
Scottish expatriates in the United States
Scottish geographers
People educated at Dalkeith High School